Kadašman-Ḫarbe I, inscribed in cuneiform contemporarily as Ka-da-áš-ma-an-Ḫar-be and meaning “he believes in Ḫarbe (a Kassite god equivalent to Enlil),” was the 16th King of the Kassite or 3rd dynasty of Babylon, and the kingdom contemporarily known as Kar-Duniaš, during the late 15th to early 14th century, BC. It is now considered possible that he was the contemporary of Tepti Ahar, King of Elam, as preserved in a tablet found at Haft Tepe in Iran. This is dated to the “year when the king expelled Kadašman-KUR.GAL,” thought by some historians to represent him although this identification (KUR.GAL = Ḫarbe) has been contested. If this name is correctly assigned to him, it would imply previous occupation of, or suzerainty over, Elam.

His provenance 
His immediate predecessor may have been Karaindaš, but he was certainly father to the better known King, Kurigalzu I, who succeeded him, as attested by his son in his autobiographical inscription, of which there are two copies, one a hexagonal prism and the other a cylinder.
 
Two baked-clay cones report Kadašman-Enlil’s honoring a land deed to Enlil-bānī made by Kurigalzu son of Kadašman-Ḫarbe. A legal text, dating perhaps to the reign of Nazi-Maruttaš, refers to him as the father of Kurigalzu.

Campaign against the Sutû 
The most significant event of his reign appears to have been his aggressive campaign against the Sutû, a nomadic people along the middle Euphrates related to the Arameans, and is described in the Chronicle P, in a somewhat garbled passage which superimposes events relating to the accession of Kurigalzu II, four generations later. He claims to have “annihilated their extensive forces", then constructed fortresses in a mountain region called Ḫiḫi, in the Syrian desert as security outposts, and “he dug wells and settled people on fertile lands, to strengthen the guard”. These events seem to be confirmed in the opening six lines of text from an unpublished kudurru in the Yale Babylonian Collection which describes his efforts to expel the Suteans from Babylonia.

It has been suggested that the Babylonian work “King of all Habitations”, which is commonly referred to as the Epic of the plague-god Erra, is a Kassite period-piece which includes the description of a raid on Uruk by the Sutû and the subsequent cries for vengeance upon them. The epic consists of five tablets comprising some 750 lines and reached its final form with the Assyrians in the eighth century, but includes older elements.

The canal of Diniktum 
On a tablet which was found at Nippur, a date “the year [in which] Kadašman-Ḫarbe, the king, dug the canal of Diniktum”, is attested. Diniktum has tentatively been identified as Tell Muḥammad. Kadašman-Ḫarbe’s reign has been identified as the point when literary activity resumed at Nippur after three centuries of silence.

Inscriptions

Notes

References 

15th-century BC Babylonian kings
14th-century BC Babylonian kings
Kassite kings
15th-century BC rulers
14th-century BC rulers